The Trafalgar class is a class of nuclear-powered fleet submarines (SSNs) in service with the Royal Navy, and the successor to the . Like the majority of Royal Navy nuclear submarines, all seven boats were constructed at Barrow-in-Furness shipyard, Cumbria. With only one boat remaining active and in commission (as of 2022) and six retired from the seven originally in service, the class makes up part of the Royal Navy's nuclear-powered ‘hunter-killer’ submarine force. The Trafalgar class has nearly been replaced by the larger and more capable , of which five are commissioned.

The name Trafalgar refers to the Battle of Trafalgar fought between the Royal Navy and the combined fleets of France and Spain in 1805.

Development
The Trafalgar class were designed in the early 1970s during the Cold War as a refinement of the preceding Swiftsure class. Including , the Trafalgar class are the fifth class of nuclear-powered fleet submarines to enter service with the Royal Navy. The first of the class, HMS Trafalgar, was ordered on 7 April 1977 and completed in 1983. The last, HMS Triumph, was ordered on 3 January 1986 and completed in 1991. All seven boats of the class were built and completed by Vickers Shipbuilding and Engineering at the Barrow-in-Furness shipyard.

In 1982, Jane's Fighting Ships recorded: "Estimated cost of fourth submarine £175 million including equipment and weapon system when fitted." In 1986, Jane's Fighting Ships recorded that the average cost for this class was £200 million at 1984–85 prices.

Potential export
In 1987, the Canadian White Paper on Defence recommended the purchase of 10 to 12 - or Trafalgar-class submarines under technology transfer, with the choice of the type of submarine due to be confirmed before summer 1988. The goal was to build up a three-ocean navy and to assert Canadian sovereignty over Arctic waters. The purchase was finally abandoned in April 1989 due to the financial economy. In 1998 the Canadian government signed an agreement to acquire four of the Royal Navy's diesel-electric Upholder-class submarines.

Operational service
The submarines of the class have seen service in a wide range of locations, most notably firing Tomahawk land-attack cruise missiles in anger at targets during conflicts in Afghanistan, Iraq and Libya. Three of the Trafalgar-class boats have been involved in such operations. In 2001 Trafalgar took part in Operation Veritas, the attack on Al-Qaeda and Taliban forces following the September 11 attacks in the United States, becoming the first Royal Navy submarine to launch Tomahawk cruise missiles against Afghanistan. During April 2003, HMS Turbulent returned home flying the Jolly Roger after having launched thirty Tomahawk cruise missiles during the invasion of Iraq. As part of the 2011 military intervention in Libya, HMS Triumph fired her Tomahawk cruise missiles on three occasions; first on 19 March, then again on 20 March, and finally on 24 March. Her primary targets were Libyan air-defence installations around the city of Sabha. Triumph returned to Devonport on 3 April 2011 flying a Jolly Roger adorned with six small Tomahawk axes to indicate the missiles fired by the submarine in the operation.

In 1993 Triumph sailed to Australia, covering a distance of  whilst submerged and without any forward support. As of 2011, this still remained the longest solo deployment by any British nuclear submarine.

Service problems
In 1998, Trenchant experienced a steam leak, forcing the crew to shut down the nuclear reactor. In 2000 a leak in the PWR1 reactor primary cooling circuit was discovered on Tireless, forcing her to proceed to Gibraltar on diesel power. The fault was found to be due to thermal fatigue cracks, requiring the other Trafalgar-class boats, and some of the remaining Swiftsure-class boats, to be urgently inspected and if necessary modified.

In 2013 the Defence Nuclear Safety Regulator reported that the reactor systems were suffering increasing technical problems due to ageing, requiring effective management. An example was that Tireless had had a small radioactive coolant leak for eight days in February 2013.

Characteristics

As a refinement of the preceding Swiftsure class, the design of the Trafalgar class bears some similarity, including its internal layout and the Rolls-Royce PWR1 Core 3. However some improvements over the Swiftsure class include its reduced acoustic signature, which is due to the hull being covered in anechoic tiles which are designed to absorb sound rather than reflect it, making the boats quieter and more difficult to detect with active sonar. A pumpjet propulsion system is also used from boat 2 onward, rather than a conventional propeller. Each boat has a complement of 130. Like all Royal Navy submarines, the Trafalgar class have strengthened fins and retractable hydroplanes, allowing them to surface through thick ice.

Four boats of the class — Torbay, Trenchant, Talent and Triumph — have been fitted with the Sonar 2076 system. Beginning in 2014, the last four boats of the class underwent a communications package upgrade.

The Trafalgar class is equipped with five  torpedo tubes with accommodation for a mixture of up to 30 weapons:
 Tomahawk Block IV cruise missiles
 Spearfish heavyweight torpedoes

Ostensibly, the submarines use the same steering column as was used in the Wellington bombers of the Second World War.

Boats of the class
Initially, the last five boats of the Trafalgar class were to be replaced by the 'Future Fleet Submarine' programme, however this was effectively cancelled in 2001. The  are replacing the Trafalgar class.

Triumph is the only remaining submarine based at HMNB Devonport. Talent and Trenchant were decommissioned in a joint ceremony at HMNB Devonport on 20 May 2022.

In fiction
In June 2019, ITV commissioned a six-part thriller to be set aboard a fictional Trafalgar-class submarine, HMS Tenacity. However, production on the series was paused in 2020, before being dropped all together by November 2021.

See also

 List of submarines of the Royal Navy
 List of submarine classes of the Royal Navy
 List of submarine classes in service
 Royal Navy Submarine Service
 Future of the Royal Navy
 Cruise missile submarine
 Attack submarine

Notes

References

Bibliography
MaritimeQuest Trafalgar-class overview
Abridged history of each boat

External links

 https://www.facebook.com/HMSTrafalgar/
 Royal Navy Trafalgar Class Submarine (royalnavy.mod.uk)

Submarine classes
 
Nuclear-powered submarines